Cambridgeshire County Cricket Club is one of twenty minor county clubs within the domestic cricket structure of England and Wales. It represents the historic county of Cambridgeshire including the Isle of Ely.

The original Cambridgeshire club, established in 1844, is classified as a first-class team from 1857 to 1871. The present club, founded in 1891, has always had minor status although it has played List A matches occasionally from 1964 until 2004 but is not classified as a List A team per se.

The club is based at The Avenue Sports Club Ground, March, though they have played a number of matches at Fenner's, Cambridge University's ground, and occasionally play games there still. In recent years, matches have also been held at Wisbech and Saffron Walden (in northeastern Essex).

Honours
 Minor Counties Championship (1) – 1963; shared (0) – 
 MCCA Knockout Trophy (2) – 1995, 2003

Earliest cricket
Cricket must have reached Cambridgeshire in the 17th century. The earliest reference to the game being played there is at Cambridge University in 1710.

Outside the university, the earliest reference is a game in 1744 in the Isle of Ely, between the gentlemen of March and the gentlemen of Wisbeach, eleven of a side, for five pounds a man.

Origin of club
Cambridge Town Club and Cambridgeshire were effectively the same team as the town club teams were representative of the county as a whole. The town club's earliest known match was against Cambridge University Cricket Club in 1819 and the county name was first used for the match against Surrey in 1857.

The town club was formed sometime before 1819 and eventually evolved into the original county club, which was formally established on 13 March 1844, playing under the name of "Cambridge Town and County Club". After 1847, the name reverted to Cambridge Town.

Club history
The county club did not play matches outside East Anglia until 1857 when it played Surrey. From 1857 until 1871, the county club was recognised as holding first-class status. The club itself was dissolved in 1869 (according to James Lillywhite's Cricketers' Companion of that year) but two matches arranged in 1869 and 1871 involved playing members of the former club and the team in both these games was called Cambridgeshire by Wisden and other sources.

The club played 39 first-class matches in all, winning thirteen, losing 21 and drawing five. The most successful season was 1864, when all 3 matches played were won. The regular home ground was Fenner's. Thomas Hayward made the most appearances, playing in 35 of the matches. He also made most runs, with 1,934 at 33.34, and scored two of the four centuries made for the county, both in 1861. He and Robert Carpenter put on 212 for the 3rd wicket against Surrey at The Oval in 1861, both scoring centuries. This was the highest partnership for the county. George Tarrant took the most wickets: 197 at 12.25, plus a further 22 wickets for which the runs conceded are not known. He had match figures of 15–56 against Kent at Chatham in 1862, including 8–16 in an innings. He also took 8–45 in an innings against Surrey at Fenner's the same year.

According to Simon Wilde, in the early 1860s Carpenter and Hayward were rated as two of the three finest batsmen in England along with Richard Daft. Daft himself ranked Carpenter and Hayward as being equal, but George Parr reckoned Carpenter to be the better. Wilde's own estimation was that Carpenter was the best batsman in England from 1860 to 1866.

The present club was founded on 6 June 1891.

Cambridgeshire first took part in the Minor Counties Championship in the competition's fourth season, 1898, and has competed every season since with the exception of 1902 and 1920. The club was revived in 1921 with HB Hart as Secretary and HC Tebbutt as captain, despite the club's financial situation being precarious. War veteran Tebbutt had debuted in 1901, but this was his final season. He later became notorious for murdering his partner and three children before killing himself.

It has won the Minor Counties Championship once, in 1963.  Cambridgeshire has won the MCCA Knockout Trophy twice since its inception in 1983. It won in 1995 and 2003.

Notable players
The following Cambridgeshire cricketers also made an impact on the first-class game:

 Gerry Alexander
 Mike Brearley
 Robert Carpenter
 Alfred Diver
 Thomas Hayward
 Tom Hayward
 Jack Hobbs
 Bill Hitch
 Terry Jenner
 Derick Parry
 George Tarrant
 Johnny Wardle

References

External sources
 Minor Counties Cricket Association Official Site
 Cambridgeshire CCC site
 CricketArchive page on The Avenue Sports Club Ground, March
 Records Relating to Sport at the County Record Office, Cambridge

Further reading
 Rowland Bowen, Cricket: A History of its Growth and Development, Eyre & Spottiswoode, 1970
 Arthur Haygarth, Scores & Biographies, Volumes 4–11 (1849–1870), Lillywhite, 1862–79
 E W Swanton (editor), Barclays World of Cricket, Guild, 1986
 Playfair Cricket Annual – various editions
 Wisden Cricketers' Almanack – various editions

 
National Counties cricket
History of Cambridgeshire
Cricket clubs established in 1844
Cricket in Cambridgeshire
Former senior cricket clubs
1844 establishments in England